In mythology, a hellhound is a demonic dog.

Hellhound may also mean:
 Hellhound (comics), a DC Comics character
 Hellhound Records, a German doom metal record label
 Hellhound, a series of poster booklets in the Galgrease manga series
 MEI HELLHOUND, a high-explosive 40mm round fired by the Milkor MGL grenade launcher
 Hellhounds (film), a 2009 Canadian horror film